Caloptilia acericola is a moth of the family Gracillariidae. It is known from Japan (Hokkaidō, Honshū, Kyūshū) and the Russian Far East.

The wingspan is 9–11 mm.

The larvae feed on Acer japonicum, Acer mono, Acer palmatum and Acer pseudosieboldianum. They probably mine the leaves of their host plant.

References

acericola
Moths described in 1966
Moths of Japan
Moths of Asia